The National Security Council of Mongolia (NSC) is a consultative body to the Office of the President of Mongolia. It focuses mainly on briefing high ranking national security and/or political figures on the state of internal and external threats in Mongolia. It also advises the President in his/her orders to the Mongolian Armed Forces under the Ministry of Defense and the National Police Agency under the Ministry of Justice and Internal Affairs. The NSC is affiliated with the larger Security and Foreign Policy Council (established in April 2010) and the Information and Analytical Council, the latter of which is composed of former politicians, military leaders, diplomats, and academics and intellectual experts.

Besides executive leadership of the council by the President as chairman, the post of Secretary of the NSC advises the president in relation to the main missions of the NSC and coordinates work on preparatory decisions and discussions for the council.

History and composition 
An article in the newly introduced Constitution of Mongolia (adopted on 13 January 1992) stated that the President will be the chairman of a National Security Council. On 29 May, the State Great Khural established the NSC by adopting a National Security Council Law. This law defined the principles, powers and functions of the NSC. It held its first meeting in August of that year under the chairmanship of President Punsalmaagiin Ochirbat and later on the next July saw the appointment of Jargalsayhany Enhsayhan as secretary. In 1994, a National Security Concept to charter the conditions and situations that the security of Mongolia is in. Over the years, the concept has been renewed multiple times, more recently in July 2010.

In March 2019, the NSC became involved in a national constitutional crisis when the State Great Khural adopted an unprecedented law on the proposal of President Khaltmaagiin Battulga on the 27th of that month which effectively gave the NSC the power to recommend the firing of judges, prosecutors and the leaders in the Anti-Corruption Agency. The opposition Democratic Party as well as some dissenting voices in the Mongolian People's Party criticized the law as an attempt to seize state power and undermine democracy while lawyers and former MPs protested by affirming that is not a constitutional body.

The NSC is composed of the following permanent members:

President of Mongolia (chairman)
Secretary of the NSC
Prime Minister of Mongolia
Chairman of the State Great Khural

The following other government officials may also be in attendance in an NSC meeting:

Vice Speaker of the State Great Khural
Director of the Standing Committee on Security and Foreign Policy
Leaders of political parties in the State Great Khural

The Ministry of Defense, Foreign Minister and Chief of the General Staff also give presentations to the NSC. The Executive Office of the NSC (currently led by Davaa-Ochir Davaanyam) supports the NSC's members in fulfilling their duties and organizes joint-government institutions in implementing national security policy.

Secretaries of the NSC 

 Ravdangiin Bataa (1992-1993)

 Jargalsayhany Enhsayhan (1993-1996)
Chaisurengiin Baatar (1996-1997)
Ravdangiin Bold (1997-2003)
Dugerjavyn Gotov (2003-2006)
Palamin Sundev (2006-2008) 
Ganbanhanbakh Manbadbadh (2008-2009)
Tsagaandariin Enkhtuvshin (2009-3 November 2017)
Amarjargal Gansukh (3 November 2017-25 June 2021)
 Jadambyn Enkhbayar (since 25 June 2021)

See also 
National security council
Bat Khurts

References

External links
 Official Website

Government of Mongolia
Mongolia
Military of Mongolia
Law enforcement in Mongolia
1992 establishments in Mongolia